John Lougher (died 8 January 1636) was a Welsh politician who sat in the House of Commons in 1601.

Lougher was the son of Robert Lougher of Tenby, Pembrokeshire and was educated at St Mary Hall, Oxford, where he graduated BA in 1594. He became a student of law at the Middle Temple in 1594.

In 1601, he was elected Member of Parliament for Pembroke and was appointed High Sheriff of Pembrokeshire for 1626–27.

He married twice: firstly Frances, the widow of Sir Thomas Smith and secondly Mary, the daughter of Sir Edward Fitton of Gawsworth, Cheshire, and the widow of William Polwhele, with whom he had a daughter.

References

 

Year of birth missing
1636 deaths
People from Pembroke, Pembrokeshire
Alumni of St Mary Hall, Oxford
Members of the Middle Temple
17th-century Welsh politicians
Members of the Parliament of England (pre-1707) for constituencies in Wales
English MPs 1601
High Sheriffs of Pembrokeshire